Fletcher-Skinner-Nixon House and Outbuildings, also known as Swampside, is a historic plantation complex located near Hertford, Perquimans County, North Carolina.   The main house was built about 1820, and is a two-story, Federal style frame dwelling.  It is sheathed in weatherboard, sits on a brick pier foundation, and features an engaged double-tier piazza. Also on the property are the contributing stuccoed brick dairy (c. 1820), smokehouse, well, and barn (c. 1860). In 1992, the Fletcher-Skinner-Nixon House was adapted for use as a bed and breakfast inn.

The house was added to the National Register of Historic Places in 1994.  It is located in the Old Neck Historic District.

References

Bed and breakfasts in North Carolina
Plantation houses in North Carolina
Houses on the National Register of Historic Places in North Carolina
Federal architecture in North Carolina
Houses completed in 1820
Houses in Perquimans County, North Carolina
National Register of Historic Places in Perquimans County, North Carolina
Historic district contributing properties in North Carolina